Hjermann is a Norwegian surname. Notable people with the surname include:

Peder Hjermann (1754–1834), Norwegian farmer and politician
Per Severin Hjermann (1891–1972), Norwegian politician 
Reidar Hjermann (born 1969), Norwegian psychologist 

Norwegian-language surnames